Eois sanguilineata is a moth in the  family Geometridae. It is found on Misool in Indonesia.

References

Moths described in 1901
Eois
Moths of Indonesia